Fazal Hussain (born 11 November 1929) is a Pakistani former athlete. He competed in the men's hammer throw at the 1952 Summer Olympics.

References

External links
 

1929 births
Possibly living people
Athletes (track and field) at the 1952 Summer Olympics
Pakistani male hammer throwers
Olympic athletes of Pakistan
Place of birth missing (living people)